Nogometno društvo Dravinja, commonly referred to as ND Dravinja or simply Dravinja, is a Slovenian football club from Slovenske Konjice, which plays in the Slovenian Third League. The club was founded in 1934. They have played 16 seasons in the Slovenian Second League, lost the promotion play-offs in 1991 and 2006, and declined promotion in 2011.

Honours
Slovenian Third League
 Winners: 1999–2000, 2008–09, 2013–14

MNZ Celje Cup
 Winners: 2006–07

League history since 1991

References

External links

Association football clubs established in 1934
Football clubs in Slovenia
Football clubs in Yugoslavia
1934 establishments in Slovenia